Blackberry Smoke is an American rock band formed in Atlanta, Georgia in 2000. The lineup consists of Charlie Starr (lead vocals, guitar), Richard Turner (bass, backing vocals), Brit Turner (drums), Paul Jackson (guitar, backing vocals), and Brandon Still (keyboards). In 2018, they added touring members Benji Shanks (guitar) and Preston Holcomb (percussion). They have released seven studio albums, two live albums and five extended plays.

History 

Blackberry Smoke was formed in Atlanta, Georgia in 2000. They are the first independently-released artist to hit No. 1 on the Billboard Country Album charts in modern history. Their debut album, Bad Luck Ain't No Crime, was released in 2003. Their second album released in 2009, Little Piece of Dixie. has been featured by Paste magazine and other publications.

In 2015 Blackberry Smoke became the first small independent outfit to have an album, Holding All The Roses, go to No. 1 on the Billboard Country Albums chart. This was the first time a non-mainstream supported artist or band was able to achieve this feat in the modern era. Blackberry Smoke's 2016 album Like An Arrow did the same. They have performed throughout the United States, Europe, Australia, and South America. They have performed alongside numerous artists such as Tedeschi Trucks Band, Guns n' Roses, Zac Brown Band, ZZ Top, Eric Church and Lynyrd Skynyrd.

The band had their first chart success with their third album, The Whippoorwill, which was released in August 2012 and reached Top 40 on Billboard 200. The album was released under the Southern Ground record label. On August 26, 2012, they performed at a charity benefit called the Boot Ride with the cast of Sons of Anarchy, partnered with The Boot Campaign at the Happy Ending Bar and Grill in Hollywood, California. 

On November 12, 2014, they appeared among many others – Jamey Johnson, Trace Adkins, Warren Haynes, Peter Frampton, Gregg Allman, etc. – in a show in tribute to Lynyrd Skynyrd at the Fox Theatre in Atlanta.

They moved to Rounder Records in 2014, and released Holding All the Roses produced by Brendan O'Brien in early 2015. The album reached No. 1 on Billboard's Country Albums chart. The band spent much of the summer of 2016 on tour with Gov't Mule.

Blackberry Smoke released their fifth studio album, Like an Arrow, featuring Gregg Allman, on October 14, 2016, via their own record label, 3 Legged Records. The album landed at No. 1 on the US Billboard Country and Americana/Folk charts as well as the UK Rock and Independent Albums charts during release week. The band released its sixth studio album, Find A Light, on December 19, 2018.

In 2019, the band released via Earache Records a live album and a film Homecoming: Live in Atlanta, recorded at their annual Brothers And Sisters Holiday Homecoming event at the Tabernacle in Atlanta in November 2018. In 2021 the band released its seventh studio album, You Hear Georgia.

On May 28, 2021, their album You Hear Georgia was released. It debuted at No. 1 on the Billboard Americana/Folk Chart. It sold over 33k copies the first week, 12,239 copies in pure album sales. This was good enough to put it also at No. 1 in album sales in both country and rock, and No. 3 in all of music. The album also racked up another nearly 1 million streams its debut week. The album was produced by Dave Cobb and also features appearances by Jamey Johnson and Warren Haynes.

Band members
Current members
 Charlie Starr – lead vocals, guitar (2000–present)
 Richard Turner – bass, backing vocals (2000–present)
 Brit Turner – drums (2000–present)
 Paul Jackson – guitar, backing vocals (2000–present)
 Brandon Still – keyboards (2009–present)

Touring members
 Benji Shanks – guitar (2018–present)
 Preston Holcomb – percussion (2018–present)

Discography

Studio albums

Live albums

Extended plays

Singles

Music videos

References

External links 
Official website

Musical groups from Atlanta
Musical groups established in 2000
American country rock groups
American southern rock musical groups
Musical quintets
Earache Records artists
Georgia
Thirty Tigers artists
Rounder Records artists
<https://www.ajc.com/things-to-do/youll-hear-georgia-in-the-music-of-blackberry-smoke/6SBKWZQQTNFEHENBX3H7THLG24/>